WBEZ (91.5 FM) – branded WBEZ 91.5 – is a non-commercial educational radio station licensed to serve Chicago, Illinois, and primarily serving the Chicago metropolitan area. Financed by corporate underwriting, government funding and listener contributions, the station is affiliated with both National Public Radio and Public Radio Exchange; it also broadcasts content from American Public Media. The station and its parent organization were previously known as Chicago Public Radio; since 2010, the parent company has been known as Chicago Public Media.  Some of the organization's output—including nationally syndicated productions This American Life and Wait Wait... Don't Tell Me!—is branded as either from WBEZ or Chicago Public Media.

In addition to a standard analog transmission, WBEZ broadcasts over two HD Radio digital subchannels, operates full-power repeater WBEQ (90.7 FM) in Morris, and is available online. WBEZ-HD2, carrying a user-generated content format focused on "urban alternative" and branded Vocalo.org, is also relayed over WBEW (89.5 FM) in Chesterton, Indiana.

History
WBEZ first went on the air on April 7, 1943, carrying instructional programming for the Chicago Public Schools.  However, initially only a few classrooms were able to tune in, because most did not have FM receivers. It originally broadcast at 42.5 MHz, before moving to 91.5 MHz in 1947. Its transmitter was located atop Chicago's Morrison Hotel and its studios were in the Builders Building. In 1949, the station's transmitter was moved to Marshall Metropolitan High School in Chicago's East Garfield Park neighborhood. As of 2021, it is atop the John Hancock Center.
 
For most of its early years, the station broadcast only instructional programs, operating on weekdays on which Chicago Public Schools were in session.

In 1970, WBEZ joined National Public Radio as a charter member and began general programming outside of school hours. Initially, most programming outside of the instructional programs and NPR programs was jazz music. The Board of Education sold the station to the current license holders, the not-for-profit WBEZ Alliance, Inc., in 1990. In September 1995 the parent company and station moved from its old offices to its current location at Navy Pier.

The corporate name was changed in 2010 to Chicago Public Media, Inc. Torey Malatia, the general manager, stepped down in July 2013 after 20 years with the station. Goli Sheikholeslami, formerly of The Washington Post, was appointed as CEO. She took office in April 2014. Goli Sheikholeslami left WBEZ to head New York Public Radio in fall 2019; Steve Edwards, back on staff at WBEZ since 2017, was named interim CEO as of the end of September 2019.

WBEZ broadcasts at 5,700 watts, which on paper is somewhat modest for an NPR member on the FM band. However, with its transmitter being located atop Chicago's second tallest building, its coverage area is largely comparable to Chicago's major commercial FM stations. Even so, some inner suburbs such as Waukegan, Aurora and Elgin only get a grade B signal.

2007 programming change
On January 4, 2007, the station's traditional overnight jazz programming was eliminated.  The music program remaining on the schedule was the world music program Radio M (formerly Passport and in 2019 re-titled Radio Z) on Friday nights. All other music hosts were to be reassigned to other positions at the station, according to a March 2006 article in the Chicago Reader.  The replacement of music programming, which management said was due to the prevalence and popularity of other music delivery systems, caused outrage amongst many in the Chicago jazz scene. Protest sites were organized but were unsuccessful. Legendary jazz disc jockey Dick Buckley retained a time slot Sunday afternoons until mid-2008.

Station management announced a five-year plan for Chicago-oriented programs to cover all seven hours between the national news programs.

Other program changes happened in October 2012, with various programs being reshuffled. At the same time, Smiley and West from PRI was quietly dropped from the Sunday afternoon line-up.

2019 programming change
The last day WBEZ aired locally-produced international programming was October 4, 2019 with the final broadcast of Worldview with host Jerome McDonnell, which aired weekdays since 1994. The news on the hour at noon stopped being BBC news October 4, and started being NPR news on Monday October 7, 2019, the start of a week of transition.

A daytime hour of Newshour from the BBC World Service began Monday October 7, 2019, replacing The Morning Shift. Beginning Monday October 14, 2019, a new local talk show called Reset started. It was originally hosted by Jenn White. This was considered a shake-up of midday programs, which had not drawn as large an audience as the NPR morning and afternoon news programs, Morning Edition and All Things Considered.

Programming

Programming on WBEZ includes international news and local news including Curious City, world music, and quiz shows. Notable national programs offered by WBEZ include All Things Considered, Marketplace, Morning Edition, Weekend Edition, PRI's The World and Live From Here. Generally, news and talk programming is heard during the day and overnight, with music and entertainment programming on the weekends.

WBEZ is best known nationally as the producer of This American Life through Public Radio Exchange, and Wait Wait... Don't Tell Me! through NPR.  This American Life began in 1995 as the local show Your Radio Playhouse; it was renamed in March 1996 and has been national since June 1996.

In addition, Chicago Public Media founded Third Coast International Audio Festival, a showcase for independent radio producers, and the producer of the weekly program Re:sound.  WBEZ stopped broadcasting Re:sound circa 2019.".

WBEZ was also the flagship station of The Annoying Music Show!, a 3-minute program that showcased generally annoying songs. The program was produced by former WBEZ program director Jim Nayder. Nayder Communications also produced the somewhat more serious Magnificent Obsession, a program of interviews with persons who have overcome various addictions. The station was also once the flagship station of Steve Cushing's nationally distributed Saturday night blues music program Blues Before Sunrise, which started in 1979 and has been independently produced and distributed by Cushing since 1995. Blues Before Sunrise, was eliminated from WBEZ's lineup in the 2007 restructuring, but was taken over by public radio station WDCB in nearby Glen Ellyn.

Its morning magazine program Eight Forty-Eight was initially named after the postal address of the station, 848 East Grand Avenue.  The show was renamed to The Morning Shift, and was dropped in October 2019 in favor of a two-hour local talk show midday, called Reset.

The corresponding afternoon program was called The Afternoon Shift. WBEZ touted the program as "a live talk show featuring in-depth interviews and conversations with [mostly local] newsmakers, artists, writers, and innovators".  Original host Steve Edwards left the station after a few months, and longtime Chicago Tribune journalist Rick Kogan temporarily replaced him.  As of 2013 and the conclusion of Kogan's interim stint, WBEZ introduced Niala Boodhoo as the show's permanent on-air host. In 2015, WBEZ canceled "The Afternoon Shift"; the final episode aired on June 5, 2015.

Another local program heard Monday-through-Friday was Worldview, a global issues program that began in 1986 as Midday with Sondra Gair.  After Gair's death in 1994, her producer Jerome McDonnell took over the program and hosted it since. It was heard nationally on Sirius Satellite Radio's now-defunct PRI channel from Sirius' inception until 2006. Worldview aired its last program after 25 years on October 4, 2019.

Chicago Public Media is a founding member of the Public Radio Exchange (PRX), a programming cooperative for public radio stations and independent producers.  The rock music talk show Sound Opinions, which moved from WXRT in 2005, was distributed nationally by American Public Media until 2010, when its distribution was transferred to PRX. PRX also distributes the film show Filmspotting.

News and news discussion/documentary programs aired on a weekly basis include Latino USA from NPR; Canadian CBC Radio shows Q, Ideas, and Under the Influence with Terry O'Reilly; and Radio Netherlands: The State We're In. Other programs that air weekly include Snap Judgment with Glynn Washington, a story-telling show from PRX and NPR.

Satellites and translators 
In addition to its main transmitter on 91.5 FM, WBEZ extends its signal by operating full-power satellite WBEQ/Morris, Illinois (90.7 FM).  The station also formerly operated a low-power translator in Elgin, Illinois (W217BM at 91.3). In 2013, Chicago Public Media purchased 91.7 W219CD in Elgin from LifeTalk Radio for $52,500, and W217BM moved to Chicago the following year and changed its frequency to 91.1 as W216CL.

Listeners can also receive the broadcast online with streaming audio, MP3 download or by podcast. , the station drew an estimated 400,000 listeners each week.

Several other radio stations also are or were affiliated with Chicago Public Media.

References

External links
 
 
 
 
 Third Coast International Audio Festival
 "The Business: All Talk", Chicago Reader, April 14, 2006, Section 2, p. 2

Radio stations established in 1943
NPR member stations
Public Radio International stations
BEZ
1943 establishments in Illinois